Candiano is a surname. Notable people with the surname include:

Alexandru Candiano-Popescu (1841–1901),  Romanian army general, lawyer, journalist and poet
Arcielda Candiano (c. 927–959), Dogaressa of Venice
Giovanniccia Candiano, Dogaressa of Venice
Pietro I Candiano (c. 842–887), Doge of Venice
Pietro II Candiano (c. 872–939), Doge of Venice
Pietro III Candiano (died c. 960), Doge of Venice 
Pietro IV Candiano (died 976), Doge of Venice
Vitale Candiano (died 979), Doge of Venice

See also 
Candiano Canal, is a canal connecting the Italian city of Ravenna to the Adriatic Sea